Érick Cecilio Vallecillo Paguada (born January 29, 1980) is a Honduran football defender, who currently plays for USA fourth tier-side Miami United.

Club career
Vallecillo started his career at Real España with whom he spent the majority of his career. He moved abroad to play the 2011 Clausura in Guatemala with Municipal. In summer 2011 he returned home and joined Atlético Choloma but he was released by the club after the 2011 Apertura. In 2012, he played in the Copa Latina for Blue Stars Honduras.

In 2013, he joined compatriot Saúl Martínez at newly formed Miami United of the National Premier Soccer League.

International career
Vallecillo played at the 1999 FIFA World Youth Championship in Nigeria and made his senior debut for Honduras in an April 2003 CONCACAF Gold Cup qualification match against Trinidad & Tobago and has earned a total of 34 caps, scoring no goals. He has represented his country in 1 FIFA World Cup qualification match and played at the 2005 and 2007 UNCAF Nations Cups as well as at the 2003, 2005 and 2007 CONCACAF Gold Cups.

His final international was an August 2007 friendly match against El Salvador.

Personal life
His brother, Orlin Vallecillo, also plays for Real España. Married to gladiz Carolina sandoval

References

External links

1980 births
Living people
People from Colón Department (Honduras)
Association football central defenders
Honduran footballers
Honduras international footballers
2003 CONCACAF Gold Cup players
2005 UNCAF Nations Cup players
2005 CONCACAF Gold Cup players
2007 UNCAF Nations Cup players
2007 CONCACAF Gold Cup players
Real C.D. España players
C.S.D. Municipal players
Atlético Choloma players
Liga Nacional de Fútbol Profesional de Honduras players
National Premier Soccer League players
Honduran expatriate footballers
Expatriate footballers in Guatemala
Expatriate soccer players in the United States